Lutuv, widely known by other Chins as Lautu Chin, is a Kuki-Chin language spoken in 16 villages of Myanmar: Matupi townships, Thantlang townships and Hakha townships in the Chin State.

Lutuv/Lautu - villages are: Hnaring, Khuahrang, Thang-aw, Fanthen (Aasaw), Surngen, Tisen, Sentung, Hriangpi@ Hrepuv, Sate, Lekang, Lawngthangtlang, Zuamang, Capaw, Pintia, La-u, and Lei Pi (Li Puv).

Distribution
Lists the following Lutuv/Lautu villages: 1.Hnaring (township) 2. Khuahrang 3.Thang-Aw 4. Fanthen 5. Surngen 6. Tisen 7. Sentung 8. Hriangpi A. 9. Saate 10.Leikang 12. Lawngthangtlang 13.Zuamang 14.Capaw 15. Leipi 16. Pintial

References

Kuki-Chin languages